Suzuka is a genus of ground beetles in the family Carabidae. There are at least three described species in Suzuka.

Species
These three species belong to the genus Suzuka:
 Suzuka kobayashii (Ueno, 1956)  (Japan)
 Suzuka masuzoi Ueno, 1989  (Japan)
 Suzuka morii Ueno & Kitayama, 2005  (Japan)

References

Trechinae